Beggars Bush Barracks was a British Army barracks located at Beggars Bush in Dublin, Ireland.

History
The barracks were designed as a training depot for the British Army and were completed in 1827, built on lands received from George Herbert, 11th Earl of Pembroke. Two squadrons of the South Irish Horse were formed at the barracks in the early 20th century. The squadrons were mobilised at the barracks in August 1914 before being deployed to the Western Front.

Beggars Bush Barracks were the first barracks to be handed over to the Irish Republican Army in January 1922. The barracks then became the new headquarters of the National Army. Erskine Childers, a leading Fenian revolutionary, was executed at the barracks on 24 November 1922 after conviction by an Irish military court for the unlawful possession of a gun, a weapon presented to him by Michael Collins.

The barracks were decommissioned in 1929 and handed over to the "Gaeltacht Industries Depot" which had responsibility for marketing goods produced in Ireland. The site is now used by various other Government Departments. The Irish Labour History Society Museum is based in the former central garrison headquarters and the National Print Museum is based in the former Garrison Chapel.

References

Buildings and structures in Dublin (city)
Barracks in the Republic of Ireland
Irish military bases